Isha Talwar (born 22 December 1987) is an Indian actress and model who predominantly works in Malayalam and Hindi-language films, besides appearing in a few Tamil and Telugu films. She started out as a model and appeared in various commercials, and later made her film debut with the 2012 Malayalam film Thattathin Marayathu.

Early life and background
Isha Talwar was born on 22 December 1987 to Indian film actor Vinod Talwar. Born and brought up in Mumbai, she graduated from St. Xavier's College, Mumbai. She joined choreographer Terence Lewis's dance school in 2004, where she learned various dance forms like ballet, jazz, hip-hop, and salsa and went on to become a tutor in the dance studio. She stated that her choreographer Terence Lewis, was "one person who changed me completely".

Acting career
Talwar worked as a model and appeared in more than 40 commercials for brands like Pizza Hut, Vivel Fairness Cream, Kaya Skin Clinic, Dulux Paints, and Dhatri Fairness Cream, besides a music video with Hrithik Roshan for the Just Dance competition. She says she spent two years preparing for her film debut. Although she had worked as a child actress in the 2000 Bollywood film Hamara Dil Aapke Paas Hai, her full-length film debut was with the Malayalam film Thattathin Marayathu, for which she took a four-month voice training class, went through a course to learn the language, and learned to play the guitar. The film which saw her play Aisha, a Muslim girl who falls in love with a Hindu boy, became a blockbuster and was listed by Rediff.com in their "Top five Malayalam films of 2012" list. Critics noted that she "looked beautiful", but had "nothing much to do" in the film. In a later interview, she stated that the role of Aisha had given her "a lot of recognition" and that she was "really happy with" her girl next-door image from the film. Her second film I Love Me by B. Unnikrishnan had her playing the female lead alongside Asif Ali and Unni Mukundan. She said that her character in the film Samantha had "shades of grey".

Isha Talwar was titled as the most desirable woman in the Malayalam film industry of the year 2015. On the subject of desirability, she stated that it's about one's personality and not good looks. When asked, who is the most desirable man according to her; she said that she finds Prithviraj Sukumaran as the most desirable man. Adding to it, she also said that he has an extraordinary charm and charisma. She also said in the 'Reporter' channel interview that, Mohanlal is her favourite actor.

In 2013, she had two releases – her Telugu debut, Gunde Jaari Gallanthayyinde, which opened to a positive response, and her Tamil debut, Thillu Mullu, a remake of the same-titled 1981 Tamil comedy film which was also a commercial success. In 2014, she was seen in the Malayalam films, Balyakalasakhi, Utsaha Committee, God's Own Country, and Anjali Menon's Bangalore Days. She has shot for an "extended cameo role" in Siddique's Bhaskar the Rascal. She has also been shooting for the Tamil remake of Thattathin Marayathu, reprising her own role. She also appeared as Maya in the Hindi movie Tubelight alongside Salman Khan. She made her Bollywood debut alongside Saif Ali Khan in Kaalakaandi. In 2020, she appeared in the Amazon Prime web series Mirzapur.

Filmography

Film

Television

Web series

Awards
 2013: Asianet Film Award for Best Star Pair – Thattathin Marayathu 
 2013: Vanitha Film Award for Best Debut (Female) – Thattathin Marayathu 
 2013: Amrita TV Film Award for Best Pair – Thattathin Marayathu
 2013: Asiavision Award for New Sensation in Acting – Thattathin Marayathu
 2013: Indian Movie Award in Qatar For Best Debutant Actress – Thattathin Marayathu
 2013: Pearl Movie Award For Best Debutant Actress  – Thattathin Marayathu
 2013: SIIMA Award for Best Female Debutant – Thattathin Marayathu 
 2013 : Nominated – Asianet Award for Best Female New Face of the Year
 2014: Nominated, South Indian International Movie Award for Best Female Debutant – Gunde Jaari Gallanthayyinde

References

External links

 
 
 I sha Talwar on wiki dekho

1987 births
Indian television actresses
Indian film actresses
Indian voice actresses
Actresses in Malayalam cinema
Actresses in Telugu cinema
Living people
Actresses from Mumbai
St. Xavier's College, Mumbai alumni
Actresses in Malayalam television
Actresses in Hindi television
21st-century Indian actresses
South Indian International Movie Awards winners
Actresses in Tamil cinema
Actresses in Hindi cinema